Lubomír Jančařík (born 17 August 1987 in Hodonín) is a Czech table tennis player. He competed at the 2016 Summer Olympics in the men's singles event, in which he was eliminated in the first round by Zokhid Kenjaev.

He competed in the 2020 Summer Olympics.

References

1987 births
Living people
People from Hodonín
Czech male table tennis players
Olympic table tennis players of the Czech Republic
Table tennis players at the 2016 Summer Olympics
Table tennis players at the 2019 European Games
European Games competitors for the Czech Republic
Table tennis players at the 2020 Summer Olympics
Sportspeople from the South Moravian Region